DSCP may refer to:
 Direction centrale de la Sécurité publique - the French name for the Central Directorate of Public Security
 Differentiated services code point, a field in the IPv4 and IPv6 headers in computer networking
 Defense Supply Center Philadelphia, a latter name of the Philadelphia Quartermaster Depot